Eilish Sheerin (born 5 October 1992) is an Australian rules footballer playing for the Richmond Football Club in the AFL Women's (AFLW). Sheerin was drafted by Richmond with their second selection and fifty eighth overall in the 2022 AFL Women's draft. She made her debut against  at GMHBA Stadium in the first round of AFL Women's season seven in 2022.

Statistics
Statistics are correct to end S7 (2022)

|- style="background-color: #eaeaea"
! scope="row" style="text-align:center" | S7 (2022)
|style="text-align:center;"|
| 31  || 12 || 1|| 3 || 105 || 90 || 195 || 21 || 4 || 0.1 || 0.3 || 8.8 || 7.5 || 16.3 || 1.8 || 3.7
|- 
|- class="sortbottom"
! colspan=3| Career
! 12
! 1
! 3
! 105
! 90
! 195
! 21
! 44
! 0.1
! 0.3
! 8.8
! 7.5
! 16.3
! 1.8
! 3.7
|}

References

External links

1992 births
Living people
Richmond Football Club (AFLW) players
Australian rules footballers from New South Wales